Adebowale "Debo" Adedayo  (born 3 May 1993), known by his stage name Mr Macaroni, is a Nigerian actor, content creator and citizen activist. A trained thespian, his popularity grew from his comic skits on social media, where he plays the role of a political figure cum sugar daddy called "Daddy Wa" or a sadistic lecturer called "Professor Hard Life". Debo popularized catchphrases like "Ooin", "Freaky freaky" and "You are doing well".

Using his satirical works and online presence, Debo is also known for his social justice advocacy. His skits satirize social issues to promote human rights and critique everyday social interactions. During the 2020 #EndSARS protests in Nigeria, Debo used his platform and presence at various protest venues to advocate against police brutality - even after becoming a victim as a result.

Early life 
An indigene of Ogun State, Adebowale David Ibrahim Adedayo was born in Ogudu, Lagos into an Upper middle class, Islamic and Christian family in May 1993. He grew up in Magodo area of Lagos where He attended Tendercare International Nursery and Primary school in Ojota, Ogudu, and now at Magodo, Isheri. After his primary education, he went to Babcock University High School for his secondary education. In 2009, he gained admission to Lead University, Ibadan where he studied law but was forced to leave by his second year due to the university's accreditation issue.

By 2011, Adedayo was a law student at Houdegbe North American University, Cotonou in the Republic of Benin but due to his vocal nature and always standing up for justice, he was forced to leave before earning his degrees.

Upon leaving Cotonou, Debo decided not to continue his education, but to take his acting career seriously. He featured in a few roles in movies and sitcoms but was urged by his parents to complete his education. This time, he decided to study Theatre Arts (his self-confessed first love) and was admitted to study a course at the Afe Babalola University, Ado Ekiti, Ekiti. However, several factors led to him not completing his education. In 2013, Debo was admitted into the Redeemer's University Nigeria, Osun State, where he finally earned a degree in Theatre Arts and Film Studies in 2018.

Career 
Adedayo started as an actor in Nollywood before creating comedy videos. In an interview with Punch Nigeria, he said that he had been an actor for a long time by doing movies and soap operas. He said movie roles were no longer coming at some point and it took a while before he decided to start online comedy.

Adedayo's comedy talks about events and real issues in Africa. He always plays the role of a sugar daddy. In an interview with he Nigerian Tribune, he said he chose the role of a sugar daddy because it represents a good percentage of naughty men who cannot control themselves.

His satirical skits highlight social and political issues like bad governance, civic responsibility, and human rights. He typically plays the role of a Sugar daddy politician known as "Daddy Wa" or a strict lecturer known as "Professor Hardlife".

Adedayo, in an interview with Punch Nigeria, said he knew he had a flair for comedy when he would mimic Pastor Chris Oyakhilome and everyone would laugh.

His skits typically feature veterans of the Nollywood and Nigerian entertainment industry, like Jim Iyke, Bimbo Ademoye, Lateef Adedimeji, Sola Sobowale, Falz and Mr. P. He has also featured fellow skit makers like Oga Sabinus (Mr. Funny), KieKie, Remote, and Broda Shaggi. He has also featured Adeyeye Enitan Ogunwusi, the Ooni of Ife.

Filmography

Movies

TV series

EndSARS 
Adedayo has been active in the End SARS movement.

On Saturday, 13 February 2021, police arrested him at Lekki Toll Gate during the #OccupyLekkiTollgate protest.

After staging a sleep-in at the state house in Alausa, with Rinu Oduala and a group of protestors on the 8th of October 2020, Adedayo continued to lend his platform to the protests and became one of the key faces of the #EndSARS movement.
 
In February 2021, upon learning that the government intended to resume tolling at the toll gate, protests resumed once again under the #OccupyLekkiTollGate movement. Adedayo and numerous other protestors were arrested and savagely brutalized by the Nigerian police till public outcry forced their release.
 
He was subsequently picked up among 49 other protesters and arrested for defying the Lagos State directive against the protest. The protesters have since been granted N100,000 bail each and arraigned on charges bordering on flouting the COVID-19 protocol on public gatherings and ‘breaking an order not to protest’.
 
In October 2021, on the 1-year anniversary of the Lekki massacre, key #EndSARS figures, including Debo, Folarin “Falz” Falana, and others, led a successful drive-by event at the toll gate in memory of the massacre victims.
 
In November 2021, the Lagos State Governor Babajide Sanwo-Olu invited key #EndSARS figures and stakeholders to participate in a peace walk. His offer was vehemently rejected by Adedayo, who instead urged the government to implement the findings of the panel that investigated the Lekki massacre.

Awards and nominations

See also 
 List of Nigerian comedians

References

External links 
 

1993 births
Living people
Nigerian male comedians
Redeemer's University Nigeria people
Nigerian Internet celebrities
21st-century Nigerian male actors
Nigerian male film actors
Nigerian activists
Actors from Ogun State
People from Ogun State
Yoruba actors